Xavier High School is a private, Catholic coeducational college preparatory school high school run by the US East Province of the Society of Jesus on the island of Weno in Chuuk, Federated States of Micronesia. It was established by the Jesuits in 1952. It was the first high school in the Trust Territory of the Pacific Islands. Bishop Thomas Feeney, S.J., D.D. from the New York Province of the Society of Jesus (the Jesuits) originally envisioned a minor seminary to train local clergy. Soon after, Xavier Seminary became the first college preparatory school in the Western Pacific.

The mission of Xavier High School is to educate students to become competent, conscientious, and compassionate leaders whose lives are guided by the Christian call of service.

Today, Xavier High School continues to provide a college preparatory education as a Catholic school in the Jesuit tradition, serving the different island-nations of Micronesia. In 2014 Xavier produced four Gates scholars; the first recipient of the Ushiba Scholarship to Sophia University in Japan; and an appointment to the U.S. Naval Academy in Annapolis, Maryland.

History
During World War II, the Japanese government urged Mabuchi Construction Company to construct a communications center for the Japanese military in Chuuk. In 1952, Xavier High School was opened at its present site on Mabuchi hill, as the first high school in the Trust Territory of the Pacific Islands. Bishop Thomas Feeney, S.J., D.D. from the New York Province of the Society of Jesus (the Jesuits) originally envisioned a minor seminary to train local clergy. Soon after, Xavier Seminary became the first college preparatory school in the Western Pacific.  The school property was added to the United States National Register of Historic Places in 1976 as St. Xavier Academy.

Academics
Xavier follows closely the academic program at Jesuit college prep schools in the United States: four years of religion, English, literature, science, and mathematics (concluding with calculus), three years of history, and two years of Latin, plus computer skills, study skills, and health and wholeness.

Religion courses are very traditional: in first year mainly the creeds, sacraments, virtues, Ten Commandments, and Our Father; in second year a contextual study of the New Testament and who Jesus is for them, following the Ignatian dynamic; in third year the Old Testament and Catholic liturgy; in fourth year discussion of major moral issues with the Catechism of the Catholic Church as a guide.

The active service component is during vacation between junior and senior year when each student devotes 160 hours to some project in direct service to the poor on their home island, keeps a journal, and at the end enters a common reflection on their experiences. Added to this is the Senior Survey Project, a semester course during which students learn research skills specific to their own island-nations, linking them again to their communities. Components specific to Micronesia also enter into the syllabus in the first year coverage of Pacific history and geography, while focusing on relationships among the various Micronesian cultures. Also, senior English classes have discussions of human rights and social justice issues.

Environmental studies is included in the biology course and also offered as an elective in senior year, along with another elective on developmental studies specific to their own places of origin. The other electives are Japanese in junior year and accounting and music in senior year.

College and career prep are covered in third and fourth year English with preparation for the PSAT, SAT, and TOEFL tests, and also in college counselling courses in junior and senior year.

Staffing and enrollment
Xavier High School employs an international staff of Jesuits, volunteers, alumni, and local people. Xavier had in 2014 an enrollment of 190 students (107 boys, 83 girls), While most of the boys board on campus, the girls live off campus and are served by school buses. Students come from the different island nations of Micronesia, serving the island-nations of the Federated States of Micronesia, the Republic of Palau, and the Republic of the Marshall Islands. They are selected by passing a written test and written recommendation. Alumni have gone on to influential roles throughout Micronesia. Some have described it as "the Harvard of Micronesia".

Notable alumni
Erhart Aten (1962),  Governor of Chuuk
John Ehsa (1975),  Governor of Pohnpei
Manny Mori (1969),  President of the Federated States of Micronesia
Peter Sugiyama (c.1962), member of the Senate of Palau
Joseph Urusemal (1973), President of the Federated States of Micronesia
Peter M. Christian (1966), President of the Federated States of Micronesia

See also
 Education in the Federated States of Micronesia
 List of Jesuit schools

References

External links
Xavier High School website

Educational institutions established in 1952
Schools in the Federated States of Micronesia
Buildings and structures on the National Register of Historic Places in the Federated States of Micronesia
School buildings on the National Register of Historic Places
Micronesia
1952 establishments in the Trust Territory of the Pacific Islands
Weno